Urticinopsis antarctica is a species of sea anemone in the family Actiniidae. It is found in the Southern Ocean around Antarctica.

Description

Distribution
Urticinopsis antarctica is a common species in Antarctic and Subantarctic waters. It has been recorded at McMurdo Sound, the South Shetland Islands, Prydz Bay, the Cosmonauts Sea, the Haswell Islands in the Davis Sea, and the Weddell Sea.

Ecology
The waters under the ice packs around Antarctica show a marked zonation. Here U antarctica mostly feeds on sea urchins in the genus Sterechinus.

Here the seabed is characterised by a layer of sponge spicules and dead mollusc shells a metre or more thick, with living sponges growing on the surface. In this zone it preys on the various species of starfish found here, grazing on and feeding among the sponges, such as Diplasterias brucei. Examination of the contents of the gastrovascular cavities of these sea anemones show that the diet can include sea urchins, starfish, sea cucumbers, brittle stars, crinoids, gastropod and bivalve molluscs, and small fish; also found in the stomach cavities, but completely undigested, were several amphipod crustaceans, and these are hypothesised to have been living there as commensals.

References

Actiniidae
Animals described in 1922